Barany  is a village in the administrative district of Gmina Świętajno, within Olecko County, Warmian-Masurian Voivodeship, in north-eastern Poland.

It is part of the region of Masuria.

The village has a population of 60.

History
Barany was founded in 1562 by Stańko Baran and Błażej Krzywiński, who bought land to establish a village. It was named after one of its founders. As of 1600, the population of the village was solely Polish. In 1939, it had a population of 147.

References

Barany
1562 establishments in Poland
Populated places established in 1562